Gwendy's Final Task is an adventure novel by American authors Stephen King and Richard Chizmar. It was published on February 15, 2022. This is the third installment of the Gwendy's Button Box trilogy. Previous installments include Gwendy's Button Box and Gwendy's Magic Feather. Set primarily in the future year of 2026 on the MF-1 Space Station, it revolves around the eponymous Gwendy Peterson, a sixty-four-year-old United States Senator from Maine. It has been twenty years since Richard Farris relieved her of the button box, but now it is back and she must face overwhelming obstacles before she can destroy it once and for all.

Plot Summary
Gwendy's Final Task is the third installment of the Gwendy's Button Box trilogy. Written by Stephen King and Richard Chizmar, the horror novel describes Gwendy Peterson's last encounter with the button box. Gwendy is tasked by Richard Farris to dispose of the box in outer space, the only place he believes the box can go to keep the world safe from it. Since Gwendy last had the box in her possession, it has increased in its power to do evil. Farris blames the COVID pandemic on one proprietor's misuse of the box.

Once the box is in Gwendy's possession, she encounters evil forces that seem determined to keep her from achieving her goal. First, her husband, Ryan, is killed in a freak hit and run accident when Gwendy is campaigning for the Senate. Soon afterward, Gwendy begins suffering the debilitating symptoms of early-onset Alzheimer's. During her trip into space, Gwendy is informed that her house caught fire. She believes the people who want to save the box and use it to harm others intentionally set the fire when they discovered the box was not there.

The novel begins in the present tense with the crew of the Eagle-19 Heavy launching into space. Gwendy is onboard as the first United States senator to ride to the MF-1 space station. The chapters that are set in the present are interspersed with chapters set in the past to give the reader background. Even though Gwendy was ready to step aside from politics, she was persuaded to run for a Senate seat in Maine against a man who supported lies and ideas that would harm the country.

It was while Gwendy was in the midst of campaigning for the Senate that Farris brought the box back to her. He told her that she needed to dispose of the box because it was becoming too dangerous. He gave her instructions that told how to dispose of it. Shortly after Gwendy was given the box, her husband, Ryan, was killed. The police investigating the hit and run accident claimed they had no witnesses or video footage. After an encounter with Gareth Winston, a billionaire who bought a seat on the same rocket as Gwendy, Gwendy was convinced Ryan had been murdered. Gwendy's friend, Charlotte Morgan, Deputy Director of the Central Intelligence Agency, had her agents investigate the crash. She determined Ryan's death was intentional and that the police had been bribed to claim they had no witnesses.

Despite her husband's death, Gwendy went on to win the Senate seat. She used her relationship with Charlotte to arrange a ride on the Eagle-19 Heavy to the space station. While there, Gwendy planned to participate in a spacewalk where she would send the button box into deep space with the help of a small rocket.

In the present, as Gwendy is traveling to the space station, she learns that Winston is part of a conspiracy to keep Gwendy from disposing of the button box. As Winston tries to steal the box from Gwendy, he tells her that he had been promised by aliens that if he brought them the box, he would be awarded his own world over which he could reign.

Gwendy foils Winston's plan to steal the box with the help of Adesh Patel, a member of the crew Gwendy trusted and with whom Farris had decided to communicate telepathically. Gwendy kills Winston to keep him from taking the box and killing her and the rest of the crew. Gwendy later explains to Kathy Lundgren, the operation commander, the power of the button box and the need to dispose of it. She tells Kathy that since she has been the proprietor of the box for the third time, she has been suffering with symptoms of early-onset Alzheimer's disease. She fears that by the time she returns to Earth, she will no longer know her name.

To keep from suffering the further debilitating symptoms of Alzheimer's, Gwendy tells Kathy that she wants to go with the box and the rocket. Kathy agrees to Gwendy's plan only because it will allow her to explain Gwendy's and Winston's disappearances as the result of an unsupervised spacewalk. Also, the Tet Corporation, the builder of the spacecraft, will not have to deal with any questions about Winston's death.

As Gwendy soars into space with the small rocket, she thinks about the sort of death Farris told her she would have. While many of Farris's predictions about her life were correct, this one appears to be off course. She accuses Farris of lying to her. As she loses oxygen in her suit, Gwendy imagines herself as an old lady in her childhood bed, surrounded by her friends as she dies.

References

2022 American novels
Novels by Stephen King
Collaborative novels
Cemetery Dance Publications books